Welcome to the Pleasuredome is the debut studio album by English synth-pop band Frankie Goes to Hollywood, first released on 29 October 1984 by ZTT Records. Originally issued as a vinyl double album, it was assured of a UK chart entry at number one due to reported advance sales of over one million. It actually sold around a quarter of a million copies in its first week. The album was also a top-10 seller internationally in countries such as Switzerland, Sweden, Australia and New Zealand.

While commercially successful, the album also drew criticism for containing new versions of all of the songs from the group's (already much-remixed) singles from the same year ("Relax" and "Two Tribes", plus B-side "War"), as well as a surfeit of cover versions in lieu of much new original material. It was later revealed that Trevor Horn's production dominated the record so thoroughly that the band's own instrumental performances were often replaced by session musicians or Horn himself. Frankie's second album, Liverpool, actively featured the full band.

However, the album's evergreen ballad "The Power of Love" subsequently provided the group with their third consecutive UK number one single.

To celebrate the album's 30th anniversary, in October 2014, ZTT through Union Square Music released a limited edition (2,000 copies only) box set entitled Inside the Pleasuredome, available exclusively from the website pledgemusic.com. The box set contains rarities on 10" vinyl, as well as a book, a DVD, a cassette (featuring 13 mixes of "Relax" and its B-side "One September Monday") as well as a new 2014 remastered version of Welcome to the Pleasuredome on 180g vinyl.

Track listing

Original LP

All songs written and composed by Peter Gill, Holly Johnson, Brian Nash and Mark O'Toole except where noted. 

The entire first side was indexed as one track on vinyl, much like the 12" singles from this album.
"War (and Hide)" features a long introduction with a percussion track and an impersonation of Ronald Reagan (by Chris Barrie) in a long soliloquy about war and love.
"(Tag)" was an unlisted orchestral extract from "Two Tribes" and featured an impersonation of King Charles -- Prince at the time -- (also by Chris Barrie) ruminating about orgasms.
"Ferry (Go)" was a short version of "Ferry Cross the Mersey", the Gerry and the Pacemakers track that backed Frankie's first 12-inch single, "Relax". A very brief extract of the vocals from this appears at the start of "Welcome to the Pleasuredome", although most CD releases before 2005 (including compilations) removed it while keeping the song's length unaltered.
The LP was also issued as a double picture disc in transparent PVC sleeve, cat no: NEAT 1. Some, though not all copies of this release suffer from deterioration of the clear vinyl in the form of "Browning" which gives the records a bronze hue over time. However, the sound quality is not affected. The album was also released on cassette, cat no: ZCIQ1. Stocks of the cassette shells were subsequently used for the 1985 release of the cassette single "Welcome to the Pleasuredome" (CTIS 107) with a sticker carrying the correct information covering over the pre printed album shells.
 A digitally remastered version was issued in 2000 including the bonus B-side tracks "One September Monday" (4:50) and "One February Friday" (4:58).

Reissues

Original CD version

The original CD version had an altered track list, offering several tracks in different versions (most notably "Two Tribes"), and omitting the cover version of "Do You Know the Way to San Jose" and replacing it with the track "Happy Hi!".

 "The World Is My Oyster/Snatch of Fury" – 1:57
 "Welcome to the Pleasuredome" – 13:38
 "Relax (Come Fighting)" – 3:56
 "War (...and Hide)" – 6:12
 "Two Tribes (For the Victims of Ravishment) – 9:07 (Version is actually "Annihilation")
 "The Last Voice" – 1:14
 "Born to Run" – 4:06
 "Happy Hi!" – 4:12
 "Wish (The Lads Were Here)" – 2:48
 "The Ballad of 32" – 4:47
 "Krisco Kisses" – 2:57
 "Black Night White Light" – 4:05
 "The Only Star in Heaven" – 4:16
 "The Power of Love" – 5:28
 "Bang" – 1:08

Some releases track "Two Tribes/The Last Voice" and "Wish (The Lads Were Here)/The Ballad of 32" as single tracks, running 10:22 and 7:35 respectively.

25th Anniversary deluxe edition

In 2010, a deluxe edition of Welcome to the Pleasuredome was released, featuring a second disc containing rare and previously unreleased material. The first CD contains the LP version of the original album. The contents of the second CD are as follows:

 "Relax (Greatest Bits)" – 16:59
 "One September Monday" – 4:49
 "The Power of Love" (12-inch version) – 9:30
 "Disneyland" – 3:07
 "Two Tribes (Between Rulers and Ruling)" – 4:10
 "War (Between Hiding and Hidden)" – 4:00
 "Welcome to the Pleasuredome (Cut Rough)"  – 5:40
 "One February Friday" – 5:00
 "The Ballad of 32" (mix 2) – 11:03
 "Who Then Devised the Torment?" – 0:16
 "Relax" (Greek Disco mix) – 6:18
 "Watusi Love Juicy" – 4:03
 "The Last Voice" – 1:14

2016 vinyl reissue
The album was reissued by Union Square Music under the Salvo label on limited edition white vinyl and was exclusively available from larger branches of Sainsbury's. The original gatefold format has been retained, as has (it appears) the original artwork, quotes and track listing.

Personnel
Frankie Goes to Hollywood
 Holly Johnson – lead vocals
 Paul Rutherford – backing vocals
 Brian Nash – guitar
 Mark O'Toole – bass guitar
 Peter Gill – drums

Additional personnel
 J. J. Jeczalik – keyboards, programming, software
 Andy Richards – keyboards
 Luís Jardim – percussion
 Anne Dudley – keyboards, string arrangement on "The Power of Love"
 Stephen Lipson – guitar
 Steve Howe – acoustic guitar (on "Welcome to the Pleasuredome")
 Trevor Horn – backing vocals, bass guitar

Production
Produced by Trevor Horn
Engineers – Stuart Bruce, Steve Lipson
Mastering – Ian Cooper

Technical
Cover concept - Paul Morley
Illustration by Lo Cole
Cover photography - Peter Ashworth

Sleeve art
The cover art was conceived by ZTT owner Paul Morley and illustrated by graphic artist Lo Cole. The front cover featured an illustration of the Frankie Goes to Hollywood band members; on the back of the album was an illustration of a large animal orgy; and the inner gatefold artwork was an image of a procession of animals entering the head of a very large phallus. The sleeve art proved controversial, and the printing company refused to print the album covers. Cole was forced to alter the orgy image by adding green fig leaves to cover the offending animal genitalia.

Charts

Weekly charts

Year-end charts

Certifications

References

Bibliography

External links

Welcome to the Pleasuredome (Adobe Flash) at Radio3Net (streamed copy where licensed)

1984 debut albums
Albums produced by Trevor Horn
Frankie Goes to Hollywood albums
Island Records albums
ZTT Records albums
Obscenity controversies in art